The  following tables compare general and technical information for a number of available applications supporting the eDonkey network.

General

Features

Features (continued)

Versions

See also
Comparison of file sharing applications
File sharing

Notes

References

External links 
 (Incomplete) list of eMule mods (German)
 eMule mod download archive (German)

File sharing software
Network software comparisons